Adriana Johanna Taylor (born 20 August 1946) is an Australian politician. She was an Independent member of the Tasmanian Legislative Council for Elwick from 2010 to 2016.

She was born in Tilburg in the Netherlands, and migrated with her family to Australia in 1956.

Taylor, a short-term Labor Party member and former mayor of Glenorchy from 2005 to 2011, ran as an independent for the seat of Elwick in 2010, which was being vacated by Labor-turned-independent MLC Terry Martin following charges of child sexual abuse. She easily defeated her Labor opponent with 49% of the vote.

She was defeated by Labor candidate Josh Willie at the 2016 periodic elections.

She was appointed Commissioner for Huon Valley Council in October 2016 following the dismissal of the municipal council by the State Government.

References

External links
Inaugural speech to the Tasmanian Parliament

1946 births
Living people
Members of the Tasmanian Legislative Council
Independent members of the Parliament of Tasmania
Mayors of places in Tasmania
University of New England (Australia) alumni
Dutch emigrants to Australia
21st-century Australian politicians
Women members of the Tasmanian Legislative Council
Women mayors of places in Tasmania
Tasmanian local councillors
21st-century Australian women politicians